The Stutz Blackhawk is an American ultra-luxury car manufactured from 1971 through 1987. Other than the name it bears no resemblance to the original Blackhawk (1929–1930). The Stutz Motor Company was revived in August 1968 by New York banker James O'Donnell. He joined forces with retired Chrysler stylist Virgil Exner who designed the new Blackhawk. Exner's design included a spare tire that protruded through the decklid, a faux radiator shell-type chrome grille and freestanding headlamps. The new Blackhawk was prototyped by Ghia in Italy at a cost of over US$300,000. To offer exclusivity and still permit easy servicing in the U.S. a General Motors platform and engine served as the base for the custom built Italian body. The Blackhawk debuted in January 1970 at the Waldorf Astoria in New York City. Prices ranged from US$22,500 to US$75,000. All early Blackhawks were coupes, but rare sedans were produced later. Convertible versions were called D'Italia and Bearcat. Stutz Blackhawks became the car of choice among elite entertainers of the day. By 1976 Stutz had sold 205 Blackhawks and about six a month were handbuilt in Italy and shipped to the U.S. By April 1980 350 Blackhawks had been sold and by the time production ended in 1987 approximately 500 to 600 cars had been manufactured.

Design and manufacturing
Its driveline being a RWD. Later Blackhawks use Pontiac's 403 and 350. Also Ford, Chevrolet and Cadillac engines were used. The handbuilt Blackhawk has 18 to 22 hand-rubbed lacquer paint coats that took six weeks to apply. Total production time for each vehicle was over 1500 man-hours. In 1980, the Blackhawk was redesigned for the Pontiac Bonneville chassis and 1985, the Oldsmobile Delta 88/Buick LeSabre Chassis.

Special features
Exner's design included a spare tire that protruded through the trunklid and freestanding headlamps. The fuel filler cap is positioned inside the spare tire on the first models. The interior includes 24-carat gold plated trim and bird's eye maple or burled walnut and redwood, Connolly leather seats and dash, instrument markings in both English and Italian, fine wool or mink carpeting and headlining, a cigar lighter, and a liquor cabinet in the back. There is a clock in the steering wheel hub on some later models. Other special features include automatic headlamp controls with twilight sensor, cornering lamps, bilevel automatic airconditioning, Superlift air adjustable shockabsorbers, Safe-T-Track limited slip differential, an electric sunroof, cruise control, central locking, a burglar alarm, non-functional exhaust side pipes, and a high-end Lear Jet AM/FM eight-track quadraphonic sound system. The first models rolled on special 17-inch Firestone LXX run-flat tires and rims. These were taken off the market however as they turned out to be unsafe.

Price and value
The 1971 Blackhawk's factory price was US$22,500; adjusted for inflation approximately US$142,440 in 2020 dollars. In 1974 the factory price had increased to US$35,000 (appr. US$182,025 in 2020 dollars). A year later, in 1975, the factory price was US$41,500 (appr. US$197,775 in 2020 dollars). In 1976 a Blackhawk's base price was US$47,500 (appr. US$214,035 in 2020 dollars). And in 1981 the coupe sold for US$84,500 (appr. US$238,345 in 2020 dollars). The Stutz d’Italia was advertised as “the most expensive car sold today” at $129,500 at the same time as the Bearcat VI was offered for under half this at “only $64,165”.  Mint condition early generations (1971–1975) estimated US$32,000 to US$35,000 in 2002. After his death Wilson Pickett's well preserved 1974 Stutz Blackhawk was auctioned off in 2007 for US$50,600.

Notable Blackhawk owners
The very first Blackhawk sold was purchased by Elvis Presley on October 9, 1970, for US$26,500. This was the second Blackhawk prototype, as built by Carrozzeria Padane (the first one, built by Ghia, was driven by James O'Donnell himself). Frank Sinatra had vied with Presley for the car. Sinatra was offered the second prototype on the condition that the distributor, Jules Meyers, could show the car at the L.A. auto show, and get publicity photos with Sinatra upon delivery. Sinatra declined, but Presley accepted and ended up with the car. Presley had it customized by George Barris after purchase. In January 1971, Presley had a mobile telephone installed for US$1,467.50. In July 1971, a hired driver destroyed the car. Distributor Jules Meyers offered US$1,000 for the wreck, but Presley declined and put the wrecked car in storage. It was only restored, with non-original parts, after his death and can now be seen at the Graceland museum. Presley bought at least three more Blackhawks and leased one other (he bought a black 1971 for himself and a white 1971 for his Las Vegas doctor, Elias Ghanem, and leased a white 1972 and a black 1973, his favorite Blackhawk, which he purchased at the end of the lease; this 1973 car is also on display at Graceland).

Other famous owners included Dick Martin (1971), Lucille Ball (who got her 1971 Blackhawk as a gift from her husband Gary Morton with a dash plaque saying I Love Lucy - Gary), Sammy Davis Jr. (who owned two 1972, one for himself and one for his wife), Dean Martin (who owned three and crashed his 1972 Blackhawk with vanity plate DRUNKY), Robert Goulet (1972), Evel Knievel (1974), Wilson Pickett (1974), Luigi Colani (1974), Lou Brock (1974), Johnnie Taylor (1975), Johnny Cash (1975), Lenora "Doll" Carter (1976) Curt Jürgens (1977), Erik Estrada (1978), Larry Holmes (1982), as well as Jerry Lewis, Charley Pride, Liberace, Willie Nelson, Isaac Hayes, Muhammad Ali, George Foreman, Tom Jones, Billy Joel, Elton John, Paul McCartney, Al Pacino, Wayne Newton, Barry White, and H.B. Halicki. The Shah of Iran reportedly owned twelve of them. Stutz collector Ken Ramsey owns at least ten Blackhawks.

Each car included a dash plaque naming its original owner.

Fictional owners
Nikki Sixx (played by Douglas Booth) in the 2019 Mötley Crüe biopic Netflix film The Dirt, drives a black 1974 Stutz Blackhawk.
Bill "Blaze" Blazejowski (played by Michael Keaton) in the movie Night Shift appears not to drive a Blackhawk but a 1981 Stutz IV-Porte sedan.
 In the movie 8mm, James Gandolfini's character Eddie Poole has a black Stutz Blackhawk.
 In the movie Never Die Alone, DMX's character King David owns a Stutz Blackhawk, which is then inherited by David Arquette's character Paul Paskoff.
 In an episode of Dragonball GT features the appearance of an escape vehicle with a remarkable likeness to the Stutz Blackhawk.
 In an episode of Columbo, ('Forgotten Lady', episode), John Payne (actor)'s character Ned Diamond drives a white Stutz Blackhawk.
 In another episode of Columbo, ('Murder Under Glass', 1978), Louis Jourdan's character, Paul Gerard, drives a two-tone black and grey Stutz Blackhawk.
 In the original Gone in 60 Seconds (1974 film), a 1973 Stutz Blackhawk (codenamed 'Karen') was one of the 48 vehicles stolen to fulfill Maindrian Pace's contract.

See also

Clénet Coachworks
Excalibur (automobile)
Cumberford Martinique
Zimmer (automobile)

References

External links
 
 
 
 
 
 

Blackhawk
Personal luxury cars
Cars introduced in 1971
1980s cars

sv:Stutz